The Laurel-class sailing sixth rates were a series of six post ships built to an 1805 design by Sir John Henslow. The first three were launched in 1806, two more in 1807, and the last in 1812. The vessels of the class served in the Royal Navy during the Napoleonic War.

Ships in class 
 
 
 Builder: Nicholas Bools & William Good, Bridport, Dorset
 Ordered: 30 January 1805
 Laid down: June 1805
 Launched: 2 June 1806
 Completed: 16 November 1806 at Plymouth Dockyard
 Fate: Captured by the French on 12 September 1808. The French named her Esperance.  recaptured her on 12 April 1810 off the Île de Ré. She was armed en flute and was carrying a cargo of colonial produce from Île de France while under the command of a lieutenant de vaisseau. The Royal Navy took her back into service as HMS Laurestinus. She wrecked in the Bahamas in August 1813.

References

 
Ship classes